According to the WHO classification, three lesional patterns can be observed

 Inflammatory myofibroblastic tumour, that can be associated with an ALK gene rearrangement
 Plasmocytic pattern ("plasma cell granuloma"), that can be linked to IgG4-related disease
 Fibrous and hyalinizing pattern: Pulmonary hyalinizing granuloma

References

Lesion